İnek Şaban is a 1979 Turkish comedy film directed by Osman F. Seden.

Plot

Cast 

 Kemal Sunal - İnek Şaban / Kaleci Bülent
 Defne Yalnız - Zeliha
 Yavuz Karakaş - Arap Nuri
 Saadet Gürses - Ayşe
 Dinçer Çekmez - Kara Mithat
 Osman F. Seden - Kulüp Başkanı
 Zeki Sezer - Doctor
 Abdi Algül - Kara Mithat's henchman 
 Macit Flordun - Coach
 Nermin Özses - Ayşe's mother
 Kudret Karadağ - Mardinli Arif's henchman 
 Ali Şen - Bekir Efendi
 Mehmet Uğur - Arap Nuri's henchman
 İbrahim Kurt - Jilet Rıza's henchman
 Baykal Kent - Manda
 İbrahim Uğurlu - Kara Mithat's henchman
 Orhan Elmas - Menajer Kayhan
 Nuri Tuğ - Gardener Recep
 Süheyl Eğriboz - Jilet Rıza
 Cevdet Balıkçı - Arap Nuri's henchman
 Çetin Başaran - Kara Mithat's henchman

References

External links 

1979 comedy films
1979 films
Turkish comedy films
Gangster films
Association football films
Films about lookalikes